Gary Robbins may refer to:

 Garry Robbins (1957–2013), Canadian actor and wrestler